Freedom is a 1981 American made-for-television drama film directed by Joseph Sargent and starring Mare Winningham, Jennifer Warren, Tony Bill. It originally premiered May 18, 1981 on ABC.

Cast
 Mare Winningham as Libby Bellow
 Jennifer Warren as Rachel Bellow
 Tony Bill as Richard
 Roy Thinnes as Michael
 Peter Horton as Bill
 Heather McAdam as Jessie
 Eloy Casados as Ron
 J. Pat O'Malley as Papa J.
 Tara King as Sherri
 Noelle North as Amanda
 Taylor Negron as Brett

Reception
The New York Times said, "Mare Winningham and Jennifer Warren are two very good reasons to watch Freedom tonight on ABC-TV, a family drama that is well directed, believable and often touching."

Home Media
Multicom Entertainment Group released the film worldwide in 2017

References

External links
 

1981 films
1981 television films
American coming-of-age drama films
American teen drama films
Films directed by Joseph Sargent
1980s English-language films
1980s American films